The Fuzhou Metro is a rapid transit system in Fuzhou Metropolitan Area, Fujian Province, China. The first line was planned to open in 2014. Due to the construction difficulties and accidental archaeologic finding, the southern section was delayed to 2016 and the northern section was delayed to 2017. Currently, the Fuzhou Metro Network consists of four lines. They are operated by Fuzhou Metro Group (Lines 1, 5, 6), and Fuzhou CETC Rail Transit Company (Line 2), respectively.

Fuzhou Metro was approved for construction on 3 June 2009. Trial service closed to the public began on 30 December 2015 and lasted for three months. The first operational line (the south section of Line 1 from Sanchajie Station to Fuzhou South Railway Station) started service on 18 May 2016. As of August 2022, Fuzhou Metro has 114.2 km of route and 78 stations open to service.

Lines

Network

Line 1 

The south section of Line 1 started service on May 18, 2016, the north section of the first phase opened on Jan 6, 2017, the second phase opened on Dec 27, 2020. This first phase is 24.89 km in length with 21 stations from Xiangfeng to Fuzhou South Railway Station. The second phase is 4.92 km in length with 4 stations from Fuzhou South Railway Station to Sanjiangkou.

Line 2 

The construction of Line 2 started on November 28, 2014. Line 2 is a 30.629 km long west-to-east line with 22 stations. The line opened on 26 April 2019.

Line 5 

The first phase of Line 5 starts at Jingxi Houyu and end at Ancient Luozhou Town. It is 22.4 km long with 17 stations. Construction of this line started in September 2017. The line opened on 29 April 2022.

Line 6 

The first phase of Line 6 starts at Pandun and end at Wanshou. It is 31.346 km long with 16 stations. Construction of this line started in November 2016. The line opened on 28 August 2022.

Future Expansion

Under Construction

Line 4 

Line 4 is planned to be 28.4 km in length and will have 23 stations. This line will start at Banzhou and end at Difengjiang. The budget for constructing this line is 18.436 billion yuan and the planned construction period is 2017–2022. The construction of this line started in December 2017. It is expected to start operation in 2023.

Binhai Express Line (Line F1) 
Binhai Express Line, or Line F1, known as Fuzhou–Changle Airport intercity railway in the environmental impact assessment report, is a regional express metro service from Fuzhou Railway Station to Wenling, linking the traditional city center to the Binhai New Area. The phase 1 of the route is 62.4 km long with 13 stations. Unlike other metro line specifically serving Fuzhou Metropolitan area, this metro line is part of the Fupuning Regional Rapid Transit System to enhance the regional connectivity of 3 Metropolitan Areas. Due to its long span, only 13 station was proposed along the 62.4 km of routes and the maximum operating speed is 140 km/h. Construction started on December 27, 2019. It will be finished in 2024.

Planned

Line 3 
Line 3 is planned to be 27.2 km long with 22 stations. This line will start at Houban and end at Nanyu Town via Fuzhou Railway Station and Paiwei Road.

Line 7 
Line 7 is reserved for Binhai New Area. It is planned to start at Jinfeng Town, Changle County and end at Jiangtian Town.

Line 8 
Line 8 is planned to be 49.9 km in length with 19 stations, linking the University Town, Technology Town and Changle.

Line 9 
Line 9 will mainly serve Binhai New Area and Changle New Town. The length of this line is expected to be 24.4 km with 17 stations.

Tickets and Fares

Tickets

Single Journey Tickets 
The single journey tickets of Fuzhou Metro are red plastic RFID tokens. The logo of Fuzhou Metro and the words "Metro Fuzhou" are shown in the center of the tokens. The English and Chinese words of "Fuzhou Urban Rail Transit" are shown on the edges of the tokens. The tickets can be purchased from the automatic ticketing machines. When entering the stations, passengers tap the token against a scanner. When exiting, the token is inserted into a slot for recycling.

Smart Cards 
The smart cards for public transportation named "Rongcheng Universal Card" can be used to ride Fuzhou Metro. Rongcheng Universal Cards can be purchased at all metro stations and several service centers in the city. The cards can also be used to pay for public buses.

In addition, China T-Union cards also can be used to ride Fuzhou Metro, but the cards are without discount on the ride.

QR Code 
QR Code is available for Fuzhou Metro. Passenger can use QR code in two mobile applications named "e-Fuzhou" and "Mashangxing" to take metro. From 25 January 2021, Alipay and UnionPay are also available for Fuzhou Metro.

Fares 
The fares are based on distances.

Infrastructure

Rolling Stock 
The Model-B trains are used for Line 1. This kind of train consists of 6 cars with 256 seats and has a capacity of around 1,500 passengers. There are 28 trains ordered for Line 1, the first few of which were produced by CNR Tangshan Railway Vehicle Co.,Ltd. in April 2015.

Accessibility

Vertical Elevators
All Fuzhou Metro stations are equipped with vertical elevators from the platform to the concourse, and from the concourse to the ground level.

Platform Pedals
Pedals for wheelchairs are available at all platforms, and passengers in need can ask staff for assistance.

Blind Lanes
Blind lanes are available from the entrances to the platforms at all stations.

Others
Accessible restrooms are available in all stations. The accessible restrooms are equipped with mirrors that tilt down for wheelchair users and multiple grab handles.

Nursing rooms are available in some high-traffic stations, which provide nursing bottle warming and disinfection machines, nursing tables, automatic hand-washing sinks, emergency call devices and other equipment.

Network Map

See also
 List of metro systems

References

External links
 Fuzhou Metro Group  – official website  (Operator of Line 1) 
 Fuzhou CETC Rail Transit Co., Ltd. - official website  (Operator of Line 2) 
 UrbanRail.net's page on the Fuzhou Metro

 
Rail transport in Fujian
Rapid transit in China
Transport infrastructure under construction in China
Metro
Rail transport articles in need of updating
2016 establishments in China